Lara Keller (born 13 April 1991) is a Swiss football striker currently playing for FC Zürich in the Nationalliga A. She previously played for FF USV Jena of the German Frauen-Bundesliga and before moving to Germany she played for SC Kriens in the Nationalliga A.

She is a member of the Swiss national team since 2010. As an under-19 international she played in the 2010 U-20 World Cup.

References

External links

1991 births
Living people
Swiss women's footballers
Switzerland women's international footballers
Swiss expatriate sportspeople in Germany
Expatriate women's footballers in Germany
FF USV Jena players
Swiss Women's Super League players
FC Zürich Frauen players
Women's association football midfielders
Women's association football forwards
Swiss expatriate women's footballers
21st-century Swiss women